Chinni Chinni Aasa is a 1999 Telugu-language drama film, produced by Thalasani Shankar Yadav, Lingasetty Lakshman Goud, Athaili Srinivas Goud under the Lakshmi Sai Srinivasa Productions banner and directed by Relangi Narasimha Rao. It stars Rajendra Prasad and Indraja, with music composed by Raj. The film was inspired by the 1966 Telugu movie Manase Mandiram, starring Akkineni Nageswara Rao, Savitri in the pivotal roles, which itself is a remake of the Tamil movie Nenjil Or Aalayam (1962). The film was recorded as a flop at the box office.

Plot
Raja (Rajendra Prasad) & Aasa (Indraja) are love birds. Just before their engagement, Raja learns that he has been affected by blood cancer and on one's deathbed. Nevertheless, Aasa forcibly makes him marry her. The rest of the story is how Aasa's hope & faith protects Raja from the death's door.

Cast

Rajendra Prasad as Raja
Indraja as Aasa
Satyanarayana
M. Balayya
Nutan Prasad as Father John
Giri Babu as Raja Rao
Subhalekha Sudhakar as Kailash
J. V. Somayajulu as Dr. Sai Prasad
Mallikarjuna Rao
Gundu Hanumantha Rao
Chitti Babu
Ananth
Junior Relangi
Jenny
Shubha
Harika as Kavitha
Anitha Chowdary

Soundtrack

Music composed by Raj. Music released on T-Series Music Company.

References

Indian romantic drama films
1990s Telugu-language films
Films directed by Relangi Narasimha Rao
Films scored by Koti
1999 romantic drama films
1999 films